Steven Washington Jr. (July 27, 1948 – March 18, 2004), known as The Window-Screen Rapist, was an American serial killer who attacked five elderly women during home invasions in St. Petersburg, Florida between August and December 1963, killing three. At the time of the attacks, he was only 15 years old, with his victims ranging in ages between 52 and 80. Having been convicted and sentenced to life in prison, he died while serving his sentence in 2004.

Biography 
Steven Washington Jr. was born in St. Petersburg on July 27, 1948. Little is known about his upbringing, but in October 1963, due to Florida's child marriage laws, he married a 15-year-old girl named Gwendolyn, whom he fathered one daughter with.

Murders 
On August 28, 1963, Washington attacked a 52-year-old woman during a home invasion. He choked, sexually assaulted, and beat her, but ultimately decided not to kill her. Six days later he broke into the home of a 72-year-old woman. As he did before, he raped and beat her, and left without killing her. The two women reported their attacks, and one described her attacker as a black man who had a grin on his face while raping her.

On September 25, Washington invaded a third home, this time belonging to 75-year-old Austria native Mary Pawliw, by climbing through an open window. He sexually assaulted, beat, choked, and strangled her to death. Washington strangled Pawliw with such force that a bone was broken in her neck. The next day, neighbors became concerned after not hearing from Pawliw all day, and they called police to recommend a well-visit. Police arrived and found her slightly decomposed body lying in her bed.

On October 20, Washington strangled 67-year-old Oleeta Lavina Beard McWaters to death. Her body was found the next day. Although she was confirmed to have been strangled, authorities could not rule if she had been raped due to the decomposition on the body. By the time of this killing, authorities began to investigate if the attacks were committed by the same person.

On December 30, Washington entered the home of 80-year-old Eva Miller by climbing through an open window. As he had done prior, he raped, beat, and strangled Miller to death. Neighbors called police shortly after reporting hearing Miller crying. The next day, her body was found. By this attack, police had already come to the conclusion that all of the attacks were related, and one newspaper, The Tampa Tribune, nicknamed the attacker the "window-screen rapist/murderer".

Aftermath 
At each crime scene, Washington left his fingerprints, usually on the windows he had climbed through. Due to this, he was arrested on January 3, 1964, and charged with the killings. Not long after, he confessed, though claimed he was suffering from insanity. In November, Washington pleaded guilty to the murders, and the following month was sentenced to serve three life sentences. In 1969, he was denied a retrial. In 1970, Washington attempted to appeal his convictions through a federal court. However, the Fifth U.S. Circuit Court of Appeals denied reviewing his case.

On March 18, 2004, Washington died at age 55.

See also 
 List of serial killers in the United States
 List of youngest killers

References 

1948 births
1963 murders in the United States
2004 deaths
20th-century American criminals
Criminals from Florida
American people convicted of murder
American serial killers
Male serial killers
Murder committed by minors
People convicted of murder by Florida
People from St. Petersburg, Florida
Prisoners sentenced to life imprisonment by Florida
Serial killers who died in prison custody